Middle Eastern folklore may include any of the following:
Arab folklore
Armenian folklore
Assyrian/Syriac folklore
Iranian folklore
Jewish folklore
Turkish folklore

See also
Middle Eastern mythology (disambiguation)